Pavel Mikhailovich Litvinov (born 6 July 1940) is a Russian-born U.S. physicist, writer, teacher, human rights activist and former Soviet-era dissident.

Biography 
The grandson of Ivy Low and Maxim Litvinov, Joseph Stalin's foreign minister during the 1930s, Pavel Litvinov was raised amongst the Soviet elite. As a schoolboy, he was devoted to the cult of Stalin, and was tapped, unsuccessfully, by the KGB to report on his parents Flora and Misha Litvinov (a story that is related by the journalist David Remnick in his book Lenin's Tomb).

After the death of Joseph Stalin in 1953 and the return of family friends from the labour camps, Pavel grew disillusioned with the Soviet system. He had a short-lived marriage when he was seventeen. In his twenties, he became a physics teacher at the Institute for Chemical Technology. It was while he was working at the Institute that he became acquainted with a group of intellectuals who were following the show-trials of the dissidents Andrei Sinyavsky and Yuli Daniel. His immersion in samizdat literature at this time brought him into contact with the works of Aleksandr Solzhenitsyn, Varlam Shalamov and Robert Conquest.

He participated in petition campagins in the USSR and compiled the samizdat collections "Justice or Punishment" (1967) and "The Trial of the Four" (1968, about the trial of Alexander Ginzburg, Yuri Galanskov, Alexey Dobrovolsky, and Vera Lashkova). When Ginzburg and Galanskov were tried for publishing samizdat in 1967, Pavel Litvinov and Larisa Bogoraz released their famous "Appeal to World Community"; the first open appeal of Soviet dissidents to the West, it appealed to the international public to protest against the closed trial. The replies that he received from Soviet citizens were smuggled abroad and published in book form in 1969. Most were sympathetic, though the collection also included hate mail that attacked Litvinov for being a Jew and for his supposed lack of patriotism. Litvinov's exchange of correspondence with Stephen Spender inspired the formation of the Writers and Scholars Educational Trust and its journal Index on Censorship.

Over the following years, Litvinov became active in the dissident civil rights movement and was an editor of its regular samizdat bulletin Chronicle of Current Events. The periodical, founded in 1968, documented searches, arrests, and court proceedings in Russia and other Soviet states. During 1967, he compiled a book on the trial of Vladimir Bukovsky and three others. Summoned to the headquarters of the KGB in October 1967, he was threatened with arrest if the book was published, but he ignored the threat and arranged for it to be published abroad as The Demonstration in Pushkin Square. He compiled a similar book about the Trial of the Four.

On 25 August 1968, Litvinov was one of the participants in the 1968 Red Square demonstration against the Warsaw Pact invasion of Czechoslovakia that had taken place four days earlier. Among the others were Larisa Bogoraz, a philologist, the poets Natalya Gorbanevskaya and Vadim Delaunay,  Viktor Fainberg, an art critic, and Vladimir Dremlyuga, a history student. They raised banners in Czech and Russian expressing support for Czechoslovak independence and solidarity with Alexander Dubček, the Czechoslovak leader who was the architect of the Prague Spring. The KGB arrested the protesters and beat them; they were tried in secret that October. Litvinov was sentenced to five years' exile in Chita, Zabaykalsky Krai, Siberia.

In 1974, after his return from exile, Litvinov and his wife Maya left the Soviet Union and travelled to Vienna by train. From there, they relocated to Rome before moving to the United States. In New York, Litvinov joined fellow émigré dissident Valery Chalidze in publishing A Chronicle of Human Rights in the USSR, which documented political repression.

Litvinov currently lives in the United States, where he taught physics and mathematics at the Hackley School in Tarrytown, New York from 1976 until his retirement in 2006.

Other 

Pavel Litvinov is a son-in-law of the dissident and literary scholar Lev Kopelev. His son Dima Litvinov is an environmental activist with Greenpeace. In 2013, he was arrested as part of the Greenpeace Arctic Sunrise ship case.

Pavel Litvinov is a member of the board of the Andrey Sakharov Foundation.

In 2005 Pavel Litvinov participated in "They Chose Freedom", a four-part television documentary on the history of the Soviet dissident movement

See also
1968 Red Square demonstration

Notes

Bibliography

Further reading

External links
 
 
 

1940 births
Living people
Scientists from Moscow
Moscow State University alumni
Soviet Jews
Soviet schoolteachers
Prague Spring
Soviet dissidents
Soviet human rights activists
Jewish human rights activists
Soviet prisoners and detainees
Soviet emigrants to the United States
Soviet people of British descent